Hypotacha bubo is a species of moth in the family Erebidae. It is found in Kenya and Somalia.

References

Moths described in 1941
Hypotacha
Moths of Africa